The sport of athletics is defined by the many events which make up its competition programmes. All events within the sport are forms of running, walking, jumping or throwing. These events are divided into the sub-sports of track and field, road running, racewalking and cross country running.

The Olympic athletics programme has played a significant role in shaping the most common events in the sport. The World Athletics Championships is the foremost World Championship event, holding the vast majority of World Championship-level events within the competition. A small number of events, such as the 60 metres, are exclusive to the World Athletics Indoor Championships.

Two further, separate World Championship events are held for their specific events: the World Athletics Half Marathon Championships and the World Athletics Cross Country Championships. Cross country is one of many events which have appeared at Olympics but no longer form part of the Olympic athletics schedule. Some events, such as the mile run, remain very popular at competitions, despite having neither Olympic nor World Championship status.

Olympic and World Championship events
Key:

Current events

Former championship events

NB: This list excludes Summer Olympic events which featured only once on the Olympic athletics programme during the first six editions

Other common events

Sprints
50 metres
55 metres
100-yard dash
150 metres
200 metres straight
300 metres
440-yard dash

Middle-distance
880-yard run
1000 metres
Mile run
2000 metres
Two miles

Hurdles
50 metres hurdles
55 metres hurdles
300 metres hurdles
2000 metres steeplechase

Relays
4 × 200 metres relay
4 × 800 metres relay
4 × 1500 metres relay
Distance medley relay
Sprint medley relay
4×110 m Shuttle hurdles relay
Swedish relay
Ekiden

Road events
5K run
5-mile run
10-mile run
Quarter marathon
25K run
30K run
100K run
Ultramarathon

Timed events
One hour run
12-hour run
24-hour run
Multi-day race

Misc
Men's Indoor 35lb Weight Throw and Women's Indoor 20lb Weight Throw
Octathlon, combined track and field event featured at the IAAF World Youth Championships in Athletics
Throws pentathlon, a championship combined track and field event at the World Masters Athletics Championships
Fierljeppen, Frisian sport of pole vaulting for distance
Softball throw, athletics event throwing for distance using a softball

See also

List of world records in athletics
Para-athletics

References
Common track and field events. IAAF. Retrieved on 2010-05-21.

Events